Jorge de Amorim Campos (born 17 August 1964), better known as Jorginho, is a Brazilian professional football coach and former player. He last coached Vasco da Gama.

A quick, technically gifted, and hard-working right back, Jorginho is regarded as one of the best full-backs of his generation, and as one of the greatest Brazilian defenders of all time. He played in his native country for five different clubs, and also spent six years in Germany with Bayer Leverkusen and Bayern Munich and three in Japan with Kashima Antlers; at international level, he was part of the Brazilian team that won the 1994 World Cup.

After retiring in 2002, Jorginho took up coaching for a short period before working as the assistant to head coach Dunga with the Brazil national team for four years. He later returned to coaching duties, being in charge of several clubs in his home country as well as his former side Kashima Antlers in Japan and Al Wasl in the UAE.

Playing career

Club
Born in Rio de Janeiro, Jorginho started playing professionally for local side América Football Club, moving after just one season to Clube de Regatas do Flamengo.

In 1989, he went overseas, joining German Bundesliga outfit Bayer 04 Leverkusen. With most teams in the country playing in a 5–3–2 or 3–5–2 formation, his tremendous offensive ability was put to good use, and he scored five goals for Bayer during his third and final season.

Staying in the country, Jorginho signed with league giants FC Bayern Munich in 1992–93, backed by a defensive line which included Olaf Thon, Thomas Helmer and later Lothar Matthäus. He won the national title in his second year, but after the loan return of Markus Babbel, a central defender who also operated on the right flank, he was restricted to just ten league contests in 1994–95.

After still appearing with success for J.League's Kashima Antlers, winning both the league and MVP titles in 1996, Jorginho returned to Brazil and played until 39, with São Paulo FC, CR Vasco da Gama and Fluminense Football Club. In 2001, he paired at Vasco with both Romário and Bebeto, but did not seem to get along with the pair.

International
Jorginho was capped 64 times for the Brazil national team, scoring three goals. He played at both the 1990 and the 1994 FIFA World Cups.

In the latter edition, he played all the matches as the nation emerged victorious. Jorginho was booked in the second-round match against the United States, but was named in the All-Star squad a few days later. He contributed two assists in the tournament, including a cross in the semifinals against Sweden that helped Romário score the winning goal. He also performed solidly against Italy in the final, including a play in which he freed himself from a double-team. However, he got injured after just twenty minutes of play, and was replaced by Cafú.

In 2006, Jorginho was hired as the head coach of first side América. However, on 31 July of that same year, he was hired as Brazil's assistant, joining the staff of former national side teammate Dunga. In two 2008 friendlies, he took over for the manager, following Dunga's dismissal in the previous game and subsequent ban from the Brazilian Football Confederation; he led the team to two 1–0 wins, against the Republic of Ireland and Sweden. Both left the national team following the 2010 World Cup quarterfinal loss against Holland.

Internationally, Jorginho also helped the Olympic team win silver at the 1988 Summer Olympics in Seoul.

Coaching career
Jorginho started his coaching career with his first club America in December 2005. In the following year, he was appointed Dunga's assistant at the Brazil national team, remaining with the role until 2010.

On 30 August 2010, Jorginho was announced as the new Goiás head coach. Dismissed on 8 November, he was appointed head coach of Figueirense the following 1 March.

On 21 December 2011, Jorginho left Figueira and was named at the helm of Kashima Antlers, a club he already represented as a player. He returned to Brazil on 17 March 2013, being appointed Flamengo head coach, but was sacked on 6 June.

Jorginho was subsequently in charge of Ponte Preta and Al-Wasl before being named head coach of former club Vasco on 16 August 2015. Despite failing to avoid relegation, he was maintained and won the 2016 Campeonato Carioca; after achieving immediate promotion, he resigned on 28 November 2016.

On 1 June 2017, Jorginho was appointed head coach of Bahia, but his reign only lasted nearly two months. The following 21 May he replaced fired Marcelo Chamusca at the helm of Ceará, but resigned on 4 June after alleging "personal reasons"; the day after his resignation, he was announced back at Vasco.

Jorginho was fired on 13 August 2018, after only 10 matches. During the 2019 season, he coached second division sides Ponte Preta and Coritiba, achieving top tier promotion with the latter side but still leaving on 11 December after failing to agree new terms.

On 21 August 2020, Jorginho was named back at the helm of Coritiba, replacing sacked Eduardo Barroca. He was himself relieved from his duties on 25 October, with the club in the relegation zone.

On 5 April 2021, Jorginho was appointed head coach of Atlético Goianiense still in the top tier. He resigned on 15 May, after just 13 matches.

On 3 July 2021, Jorginho took over first division newcomers Cuiabá. He managed to keep the club in the first division, but left when his contract ended after failing to agree new terms.

On 16 May 2022, Jorginho returned to Atlético, replacing sacked Umberto Louzer, but was himself dismissed on 27 August. On 5 September, he returned to Vasco in the second tier, and left on 10 November after achieving promotion.

Personal life
Jorginho is a born-again Christian. Alongside compatriots Cláudio Taffarel and Bismarck – also footballers – he was featured sharing his faith in a special version of the film Jesus, produced and distributed during the 1998 World Cup.

He also founded the club Bola Pra Frente in his Rio de Janeiro slum of Guadalupe.

Managerial statistics

Honours

Player
Flamengo
Copa União: 1987 
Campeonato Carioca: 1986
Taça Guanabara: 1984, 1988

Bayern Munich
Bundesliga: 1993–94

Kashima Antlers
J.League: 1996, 1998

Vasco da Gama
Campeonato Brasileiro Série A: 2000
Copa Mercosur: 2000
Taça Guanabara: 2000

Brazil
FIFA World Cup: 1994
FIFA U-20 World Cup: 1983
Summer Olympic Games: Silver medal 1988
Rous Cup: 1987

Individual
FIFA Fair Play Award: 1991
FIFA XI: 1991
FIFA World Cup All-Star Team: 1994
J.League MVP: 1996
J.League Best XI: 1996
J.League Cup MVP: 1997

Manager
Kashima Antlers
J.League Cup: 2012
Suruga Bank Championship: 2012

Vasco da Gama
Campeonato Carioca: 2016

Notes

References

External links
 
 Leverkusen who's who
 
 
 
 

1964 births
Living people
Footballers from Rio de Janeiro (city)
Brazilian Christians
Brazilian footballers
Association football defenders
Association football midfielders
America Football Club (RJ) players
CR Flamengo footballers
Bayer 04 Leverkusen players
FC Bayern Munich footballers
Kashima Antlers players
São Paulo FC players
CR Vasco da Gama players
Fluminense FC players
Campeonato Brasileiro Série A players
Bundesliga players
J1 League players
J1 League Player of the Year winners
Brazil under-20 international footballers
Olympic footballers of Brazil
Brazil international footballers
Footballers at the 1983 Pan American Games
1987 Copa América players
Footballers at the 1988 Summer Olympics
1990 FIFA World Cup players
1994 FIFA World Cup players
1995 Copa América players
Pan American Games medalists in football
Pan American Games bronze medalists for Brazil
Olympic medalists in football
Olympic silver medalists for Brazil
Medalists at the 1988 Summer Olympics
FIFA World Cup-winning players
Brazilian expatriate footballers
Brazilian expatriate sportspeople in Germany
Brazilian expatriate sportspeople in Japan
Expatriate footballers in Germany
Expatriate footballers in Japan
Brazilian football managers
Campeonato Brasileiro Série B managers
America Football Club (RJ) managers
Goiás Esporte Clube managers
Figueirense FC managers
Kashima Antlers managers
CR Flamengo managers
Associação Atlética Ponte Preta managers
Al-Wasl F.C. managers
CR Vasco da Gama managers
Esporte Clube Bahia managers
Ceará Sporting Club managers
Coritiba Foot Ball Club managers
Atlético Clube Goianiense managers
Cuiabá Esporte Clube managers
Campeonato Brasileiro Série A managers
UAE Pro League managers
J1 League managers
Brazilian expatriate football managers
Brazilian expatriate sportspeople in the United Arab Emirates
Expatriate football managers in Japan
Expatriate football managers in the United Arab Emirates
Medalists at the 1983 Pan American Games
Expatriate footballers in West Germany
Brazilian expatriate sportspeople in West Germany